Mao Xinyuan (born July 2, 1971) is a retired male race walker from PR China. He competed for his native country at the 1996 Summer Olympics.

Achievements

References

sports-reference

1971 births
Living people
Athletes (track and field) at the 1996 Summer Olympics
Chinese male racewalkers
Olympic athletes of China
Asian Games medalists in athletics (track and field)
Athletes (track and field) at the 1990 Asian Games
Asian Games gold medalists for China
Medalists at the 1990 Asian Games